This is the family tree of Emperors of Mexico and their descendants, mostly members of the House of Iturbide.

References

Mexican monarchy
Mexico